The Phantom Carriage is a 1958 Swedish horror film directed by Arne Mattsson. It was entered into the 9th Berlin International Film Festival. It is based on the 1912 Selma Lagerlöf novel Thy Soul Shall Bear Witness! and is a remake of the 1921 film.

Plot summary

Cast
 Edvin Adolphson as Georges
 Anita Björk as Mrs. Holm
 Bengt Brunskog as Gustafson
 George Fant as David Holm
 Ulla Jacobsson as Edit
 Isa Quensel as Maria

References

External links
 
 
 

1958 films
1950s fantasy films
1958 horror films
Swedish black-and-white films
Remakes of Swedish films
1950s Swedish-language films
Swedish horror films
Films based on Swedish novels
Films based on works by Selma Lagerlöf
Films directed by Arne Mattsson
Films scored by Dag Wirén
Films set around New Year
Phantom vehicles
Sound film remakes of silent films
Horror film remakes
1950s Swedish films